Basil Lazarus III was the Syriac Orthodox Maphrian of the East from 1709 until his death in 1713.

Biography
Iyawannis Lazarus was ordained bishop of Mansuriyya by Patriarch Ignatius Abdulmasih I in 1684, in which year he later also attended the consecration of the Holy Chrism at the Church of the Forty Martyrs at Mardin. In 1709, Lazarus was ordained as Maphrian of the East by Patriarch Ignatius Isaac II, upon which he assumed the name Basil. Lazarus served as Maphrian of the East until his death in mid-1713.

References

Bibliography

Maphrians
1713 deaths
17th-century Oriental Orthodox bishops
18th-century Oriental Orthodox archbishops
Assyrians from the Ottoman Empire
17th-century people from the Ottoman Empire
Oriental Orthodox bishops in the Ottoman Empire
18th-century people from the Ottoman Empire